Jayne Bryant is a Welsh Labour Party politician. Since May 2016 she has represented Newport West in the Senedd.

Background
Bryant was born in the Royal Gwent Hospital in Newport. She attended St Julian's Comprehensive School and completed her studies at Keele University, graduating with a degree in History and Politics.

Political career
She contested the Wales European Parliament constituency as the second-place candidate on the Labour list in 2014, but was not elected. She was subsequently selected as the Labour candidate for Newport West for the 2016 National Assembly for Wales election and she retained the seat for Labour. In 2017 she was one of the founders of the Purple Plaques scheme of public markers for remarkable women who lived in Wales.

References

Year of birth missing (living people)
Living people
Alumni of Keele University
Welsh Labour members of the Senedd
Female members of the Senedd
Wales MSs 2016–2021
Wales MSs 2021–2026
People from Newport, Wales